Acequia Madre House is a house built at 614 Acequia Madre in Santa Fe, in the U.S. state of New Mexico, in 1926 in Territorial Revival style. Built by Eva Scott Fényes (1849-1930), her daughter Leonora Scott Muse Curtin (1879-1972) and granddaughter Leonora Frances Curtin Paloheimo (1903-1999), it today houses their legacy in the form of vast collections, spanning more than 150 years of family history. About 4,000 objects, 12,000 photographs, 700 boxes of archival material, and a historic library of 5,000 books. The property was bought in 1922.

The Collections 

The object collections comprise of about 600 paintings and prints. Eva Scott Fényes, as well as her granddaughter Leonora Frances Curtin Paloheimo were watercolor artists. Eva collected self-portraits by artists and organized them in two albums. She kept close friendships with many artists from New Mexico and California, where she had her second home in Pasadena. Works by Awa Tsireh, Julian Martinez, Muhammad Ben Ali Ribati, Sheldon Orin Parsons, Gerald Cassidy, Gustave Baumann, Benjamin Brown, Howell Chambers Brown and many others can be found here.

The extensive and worldwide pottery collection contains works by Maria Martinez, Margaret Tafoya, Arabia, and sculptor Frank Applegate.  

Another focus lies on traditional arts and crafts from New Mexico. To support local traditions, the family helped found the Spanish Colonial Arts Society in 1925 and Leonora Frances Curtin Paloheimo founded the Native Market on West Palace Avenue in Santa Fe, with branches in Tucson and New York in 1934.

Extensive collections from their travels around the world were partly used to inspire local New Mexican arts and crafts. 

The Native Market archive is kept as part of the archives at Acequia Madre House. 

More than 6,000 photographs are available online in the New Mexican Digital Collections of the University of New Mexico.

Acequia Madre House is also home of the Women's International Study Center, founded in 2013.

References 

Buildings and structures in Santa Fe, New Mexico